The House of Collalto (full name - Princes of Collalto and San Salvatore) is an old and distinguished Austro-Italian noble house of Lombard origin, named after their seat at Collalto in Susegana, now in the Province of Treviso in Italy. Throughout its history, the house had their possessions in Italy, Austria and Moravia. Its name comes from Italian (colle alto - high hill).

Nowadays, Collalto is a wine producer in Sussegana near Treviso and the head of the family is Princess Isabella Collalto de Croÿ, firstborn of Prince Manfredo and Princess Trinidad di Collalto.

History

There is no definite evidence on the house's origins, but tradition holds that they were initially Lombards. The first documents about the house come from 958. In 1110 the castle Collalto in the hills near the Piave river was biuilt. Later in the 13th century, Rambaldo VIII. had the castle San Salvatore built. The founder of the Austrian family branch was Marco Carlo Collalto, an ambassador of the Holy Roman Emperor Charles IV: at the court of Innocent IV. The family was raised to the rank of Imperial Count in 1610 by Emperor Ferdinand II, who sold the Moravian possessions with the centre in Brtnice (Pirnitz) to Rambaldo XIII. On 22 November 1822 they were raised to the rank of Prince in Austria. The family belonged to the list of 16 Princely Houses that were not mediatized.

The Italian possessions consisted of the castles Collalto and San Salvatore. The Moravian possessions gained by Rambald XIII were in the extent of 10,827 ha. The house owned them till 1945, when they were confiscated by Czechoslovakian state.

Coat of arms

Members
 Ramboldo, Count of Collalto, Holy Roman field marshal during the Thirty Years' War.

Bibliography
 Genealogisches Handbuch des Adels, fürstliche Häuser, Bd. 3, C.A Starke Verlag, Limburg a. d. Lahn 1953
 Franz Gall: "Österreichische Wappenkunde", Handbuch der Wappenwissenschaft, Verlag Böhlau, Wien-Köln-Weimar 1977,

References

External links 

Italian noble families
Austrian noble families